Luka Luković (born 11 October 1996) is a Serbian footballer, who plays as an attacking midfielder for FK Javor Ivanjica.

Club career
After period in Red Star Belgrade, he left to Novi Sad, and joined Vojvodina. He made his Serbian SuperLiga debut for Vojvodina on away match against Radnički Kragujevac on 26 April 2014. He terminated the contract with Vojvodina and left the club in summer 2015 as a free agent. After he spent a season with Biel-Bienne in the Swiss Challenge League, Luković joined Bačka in summer 2016. Scoring goal in second match for new club, Luković made the first Serbian SuperLiga victory for Bačka. In summer 2018, after contract with Bačka expired, Luković agreed on a three-year deal with the Belgian First Division A side Royal Excel Mouscron as a single player.

On 21 January 2019, Luković signed with FK Čukarički until June 2022.

Career statistics

Club

References

External links
 Luka Luković Stats at utakmica.rs 
 
 
 

1996 births
Living people
Footballers from Belgrade
Association football midfielders
Serbian footballers
Serbian expatriate footballers
Red Star Belgrade footballers
FK Vojvodina players
OFK Bačka players
FC Biel-Bienne players
Royal Excel Mouscron players
FK Čukarički players
FK Javor Ivanjica players
Serbian SuperLiga players
Belgian Pro League players
Swiss Challenge League players
Serbian First League players
Serbian expatriate sportspeople in Switzerland
Serbian expatriate sportspeople in Belgium
Expatriate footballers in Switzerland
Expatriate footballers in Belgium